Deccan Radio is a first radio station of Hyderabad State (now Hyderabad, India) went live on air on 3 February 1935, initially it was launched as a private broadcasting station with transmitting power of 200 Watts. The programs were broadcast in Urdu. It was located at chirag ali lane, Abids, Hyderabad State.

Mir Osman Ali Khan, Asaf Jah VII took over The Deccan Radio and nationalized it on 3 February 1935. A new radio station was set up at Khairatabad, and a new transmitter of 500 Watts with 730 kHz was installed which was purchased from Marconi Company, England. During Second World War a special broadcast studio was set up at Saroornagar to live updated news programs. In the same year the new radio station was started at Aurangabad (then the Nizams domain) where the previous 200 Watt transmitter was shifted from Hyderabad. It was a district level radio station to broadcast the programs in Urdu and Marathi as most of the population speak Marathi.

On 1 December 1948, the Nizams inaugurated an upgraded 800 Watts unit, a shortwave transmitter which was installed with the mediumwave station and operated with 3335 and 6210 kHz. The World Radio Handbook had consecutively listed the editions of this station. Though, in the early 1919 the British cantonment of Secunderabad established the early communication station in the Hyderabad State and in 1924 an unknown spark station was operated from same region to which the Australian radio magazine in the same year named as VWT station.

It serves as an official broadcaster of erstwhile Nizams's of Hyderabad, on 1 April 1950 Deccan Radio was taken over by Indian Government and in 1956 it was merged with All India Radio (AIR) and since then it is known as AIR-Hyderabad (100 kW).

References 

Radio stations in Hyderabad
Urdu-language mass media
Defunct radio stations
Defunct mass media in India
Radio stations established in 1935
Radio stations disestablished in 1956